Biruta Delle (January 17, 1944) is a Latvian painter mainly noted for her portraits and landscapes.

Biography 
She was born Biruta Priekule on January 17, 1944, in Riga, Latvia, in a family of laborers. Her husband is Jānis Kampars, a philosopher.

The first interest in art Delle obtained in the Riga 2nd secondary school, where she was taught by Auseklis Baušķenieks and Ansis Stunda. Biruta Delle has attended the Art Academy of Latvia (1964- 1967) where one of the most important teachers for her artistic development was Konrāds Ubāns. Delle is participating in exhibitions since 1967 and has organised solo exhibitions in Kuldīga, Jūrmala, Riga, Mazirbe, Cēsis, Tukums, Smiltene and elsewhere. She is a member of the Artists Union of Latvia since 1975.

In 2013, an album of Biruta Delle's works compiled by art scholar Anda Treija was published, which contains approximately 200 reproductions of the artist's works. Publisher – "Daugava" gallery.

Art 
Biruta Delle works in oil, paints landscapes, portraits and figurative compositions. Paintings usually groups on cycles.

The portraits of Birutas Delle have been posed by specific people, their individual features can be drawn in them, however, the details, gestures and names indicate a certain generalization, some grotesque elements are also used, which are very characteristic of the artist.

Selected works 
Figurative paintings:
Prometheus, 1971
Gordian Knot, 1973

Portraits:
Self-portrait, 2012

External links 
 Biography and artworks by Biruta Delle, Rīgas Galerija
 Artworks by Biruta Delle, Galerija Romas dārzs

References 

1944 births
Living people
Latvian women painters